Michael Kitso Dingake (born 11 February 1928, in Bobonong) is a Botswana political activist and writer.

Life
Educated in South Africa, Dingake joined the African National Congress in 1952. In 1966 he was sentenced to 15 years on Robben Island. Released in 1981, he worked at the University of Botswana. In 1992 he entered national politics, becoming vice-president of the Botswana National Front in 1993 and entering the National Assembly as MP for Gaborone Central in 1994. In 1998 he led the breakaway Botswana Congress Party, but lost his seat to Margaret Nasha of the Botswana Democratic Party in 1999. Retiring from politics in 2004, he became a weekly columnist for the newspaper Mmegi.

References

External links
Mr. Michael Kitso Dingake, Kutlwano Magazine

1928 births
Living people
Members of the National Assembly (Botswana)
Botswana journalists
Recipients of the Order of the Companions of O. R. Tambo
Botswana National Front politicians
Botswana Congress Party politicians
Academic staff of the University of Botswana
Botswana people imprisoned abroad
Inmates of Robben Island
Botswana expatriates in South Africa